Ruth Ida Krauss (July 25, 1901 – July 10, 1993) was an American writer of children's books, including The Carrot Seed, and of theatrical poems for adult readers. Many of her books are still in print.

Early life and education
Ruth Krauss was born July 25, 1901, in Baltimore, Maryland to Julius Leopold and Blanche Krauss. As a child, Ruth had numerous health problems, including the rare autoimmune disorder pemphigus. She began writing and illustrating her own stories while still a child, hand sewing her pages into books.

Ruth went to a local high school but left in 1917 after her sophomore year to focus on the study of art. She enrolled in the Maryland Institute for the Promotion of the Mechanic Arts (now known as the Maryland Institute College of Art). The school's focus on applied arts did not suit her and she left after about a year. Her next stop was a girls camp, Camp Walden in Maine, where she discovered her love for writing; the camp yearbook for 1919 contains her first published piece of writing. After the camp, she spent some time studying violin in the Peabody Institute of Music's preparatory program. She was considered a gifted but undisciplined musician by her teachers.

Ruth's father died in late 1921, requiring Ruth to drop out of school. She took a series of office jobs. In 1927, she decided to enroll at the Parsons School of Design in New York. Graduating from Parsons in 1929, as the Great Depression was beginning, she found it difficult to get work as an illustrator. Among the work she did find in this period was the first pictorial book jacket for the Modern Library (Alice in Wonderland, 1932).

Ruth was a member of the Writers' Laboratory at the Bank Street College of Education in New York during the 1940s.

In the 1930s, Ruth was married to journalist and crime novelist Lionel White; they divorced shortly before World War II.

Personal life and career
Ruth Krauss married children's book author Crockett Johnson in 1943. They collaborated on many books, among them The Carrot Seed, How to Make an Earthquake, Is This You? and The Happy Egg.

Another eight of her books were illustrated by Maurice Sendak, starting with A Hole Is to Dig (1952), which launched Sendak's career. The Krauss-Sendak collaborations spawned a host of imitators of their "unruly" and "rebellious" child protagonists. The peculiar definitional phrasing of Krauss's writing in this book—with sentences like "A party is to make little children happy"—became something of a cultural phenomenon when the book was first published and has helped to maintain its popularity.

Krauss also illustrated a few of her own books. In addition to her books for children, Krauss wrote three collections of poetry and plays in verse for adults.

Recognition
Two books that Krauss wrote were runners-up for the prestigious Caldecott Medal, which is awarded to children's book illustrators: The Happy Day (1950) and A Very Special House (1954). 

Maurice Sendak characterized Krauss as a giant in the world of children's literature, saying: "Ruth broke rules and invented new ones, and her respect for the natural ferocity of children bloomed in to poetry that was utterly faithful to what was true in their lives". He honored her in the New Yorker cover illustration for Sept. 27, 1993, which shows a homeless boy using Krauss's book A Hole Is to Dig as a pillow and another child holding I Can Fly as they sleep.

Books

Children's books
 A Good Man and His Good Wife, illustrated by Ad Reinhardt (1944); re-illustrated by Marc Simont (1962)
 The Carrot Seed, illus. Crockett Johnson (1945)
 The Great Duffy, illus. Mischa Richter (1946)
 The Growing Story, illus. Phyllis Rowand (1947)
 Bears, illus. Rowand (1948); re-illus. Maurice Sendak (2005)
 The Happy Day, illus. Marc Simont (1949) —a Caldecott Medal Honor Book for Simont
 The Big World and the Little House, illus. Simont (1949).
 The Backward Day, illus. Simont (1950)
 I Can Fly, illus. Mary Blair (1950)
 The Bundle Book, illus. Helen Stone (1951)
 A Hole is to Dig: A First Book of First Definitions, illus. Sendak (1952)
 A Very Special House, illus. Sendak (1953) —a Caldecott Medal Honor Book for Sendak
 I'll Be You and You Be Me, illus. Sendak (1954)
 How To Make An Earthquake, illus. Johnson (1954)
 Charlotte and the White Horse, illus. Sendak (1955)
 Is This You?, by Krauss and Johnson (1955)
 I Want to Paint My Bathroom Blue, illus. Sendak (1956)
 Monkey Day, illus. Phyllis Rowand (1957)
 The Birthday Party, illus. Sendak (1957)
 Somebody Else's Nut Tree, and Other Tales from Children, illus. Sendak (1958)
 A Moon or a Button: A Collection of First Picture Ideas, illus. Remy Charlip (1959
 Open House for Butterflies, illus. Sendak (1960)
 Mama, I Wish I Was Snow; Child You'd Be Very Cold, illus. Ellen Raskin (1962)
 A Bouquet of Littles, illus. Jane Flora (1963
 Eyes, Nose, Fingers, Toes, illus. Elizabeth Schneider (1964)
 What a Fine Day for ..., illus. Remy Charlip, music by Al Carmines (1967)
 The Happy Egg, illus. Johnson (1967)
 This Thumbprint: Words and Thumbprints (1967)
 The Little King, the Little Queen, the Little Monster and Other Stories You Can Make Up Yourself (1968)
 If Only (1969)
 I Write It, illus. Mary Chalmers (1970)
 Under Twenty (1970)
 Everything Under a Mushroom, illus. Margot Tomes (1973)
 Love and the Invention of Punctuation (1973)
 Little Boat Lighter Than a Cork, illus. Esther Gilman (1976)
 Under Thirteen (1976)
 When I Walk I Change the Earth (1978)
 Somebody Spilled the Sky, illus. Eleanor Hazard (1979)
 Minnestrone (1981)
 Re-examination of Freedom (1981)
 Love Poems for Children (1986)
 Big and Little, illus. Mary Szilagyi (1987)
 And I Love You, illus. Steven Kellogg (1987)

Poetry and verse plays
 There's A Little Ambiguity Among the Bluebells and Other Theater Poems (1968) 
 The Cantilever Rainbow, illus. Antonio Frasconi (1965)
 This Breast Gothic (1973)

See also

References

Further reading
Nel, Philip. Crockett Johnson and Ruth Krauss: How an Unlikely Couple Found Love, Dodged the FBI, and Transformed Children's Literature. University of Mississippi Press, 2012.

External links
 Ruth Krauss papers at the University of Connecticut Libraries
 Ruth Krauss at Library of Congress Authorities – with 63 catalog records

1901 births
1993 deaths
American children's writers
American women poets
Writers from Baltimore
20th-century American poets
American women children's writers
20th-century American women writers